Sarah Stein (née Samuels) (July 26, 1870 – 1953) was an American art collector. With her husband Michael Stein, the older brother of Leo Stein and Gertrude Stein, she lived in Paris from 1903 to 1935. She supported and popularized the painter Henri Matisse.

Early life
Sarah Samuels was born in San Francisco. She was the daughter of a wealthy German-Jewish merchant. She was given the nickname "Sally" by Jack London. 

She married Michael Stein in March 1894. They had one child, Allan Daniel Stein, who was born on November 1, 1895 in San Francisco. Michael sold a streetcar business in 1903 and moved with Sarah and Allan to Paris in the same year.

Collectors in Paris
Sarah and her husband lived mostly in and out of Paris. "The couple was ... educated, and up-to-date. They collected art and tried to keep abreast of the latest trends in education, health, and philosophy."

Sarah and Michael lived in conventional bourgeois comfort as they accumulated paintings and other objects with as much enthusiasm as Leo and Gertrude Stein. The couple concentrated almost exclusively on the work of Henri Matisse, beginning with their first purchase (with Leo and Gertrude) of Woman with a Hat at the Salon d'Automne in 1905. Sarah next bought Matisse’s La Raie verte (The Green Line) (1905), another of the misunderstood masterpieces from the mythical Salle des Fauves. She was one of Matisse's staunchest friends and supporters from 1905 until she and her husband left Paris in the 1930s. In 1906, on a visit to the U.S. after the San Francisco earthquake, Sarah and her husband brought Matisse's work to America, and later took occasional commissions to secure other examples of his works for American collectors. In 1907, Matisse included the Steins' son Allan in his 1907 painting Boy With a Butterfly Net.

In 1908, with a little financial help of Michael, Sarah persuaded Matisse to open a school of painting. Matisse converted his studio at an old convent building on the rue de Sèvres into a school in which he could instruct a chosen few. At a time when Matisse was in considerable economic distress, Sarah made him her hero, and many of her evenings at home with guests became opportunities for her to defend the work of this man who, she was convinced, was a great master. Sarah took informal instruction from Matisse. In her notes for the class, the most detailed record of what went on that has survived, Matisse sounded humanistic rather than radical. He stressed the value of working from the antique, and condemned any modern neglect of spiritual values.

The Steins were among the Americans who loaned Matisse's work to the 1913 Armory Show, two examples that provided the largest public in America with its first close look at a notorious modernist. In 1914, the Steins agreed to lend nineteen of their finest canvases to Berlin, for an exhibition in Fritz Gurlitt’s Gallery. World War I blocked their works in Germany and they were never recovered. Later, in 1925, the couple bought the panoramic Tea (1919), giving it a central spot in their Palo Alto home after 1935.

Sarah and her husband also instituted a weekly open house where they showed their growing collection. "The popular Saturday evening gatherings held at 58 rue Madame, the remodeled parish house into which the elder Steins moved soon after their arrival in Paris, ... provided Sarah with a captive audience for he disquisitions on Matisse's genius."
Sarah used the open houses as a forum in which to talk about and ideas.

Sarah Stein left little evidence of her religious views. But at least in art, and in the realm of humanities, Sarah was religious. If she did not attend the synagogue, she did attend to the ways in which works of art could penetrate into the visible world.

Her commitment to the art of Henri Matisse -as a collector of his work, and as his student and friend- was unshakable and resulted in the formation of not only the Stein's own art collection but also of the Cone sisters, Etta and Claribel, in Baltimore for whom she and Michael acquired numerous pictures.

Religion
By 1908 Sarah had embraced the teaching of Christian Science. Sarah became a Christian Science "practitioner" or "healer". The new religion was becoming increasingly popular among educated, progressive women like herself, particularly well-to-do Reform Jews. Sarah Stein possessed a number of qualities that predisposed her to embrace Christian Science: she was focused on her health and that of her family, open to spiritual and aesthetic experiences. She could also be a good listener and a sympathetic advisor.

Villa Stein-de Monzie
Sarah and Michael's activities as patrons of art and architecture bear the distinct stamp of Sarah's vibrant personality, her reform-mindedness, and her spiritualism. Les Terrases (Villa Stein) at Garches in the suburbs of Paris is the largest and most luxurious house that Le Corbusier designed in the 1920s. The house was built for Sarah, Michael and their longtime friend Gabrielle Colaco-Osorio de Monzie (1882–1961) between 1926 and 1928. For the Steins and their friend the house represented a watershed, the realization of many of the aspirations and ideals of their years in Paris. Very little has been published about the contributions of the Steins and Madam de Monzie as clients, or as participants in the process of building this remarkable work of architecture.

It was Christian Science that bought Sarah Stein and Gabrielle de Monzie together some years before they met Le Corbusier, and their bond forged by their deep commitment to each other motivated them to form  a single household. The unique structure  of the household, combined with the clients' commitment to modern architecture, art, and religion created a framework within Le Corbusier  could develop a new approach to domestic architecture.

Sarah Stein shared many of Le Corbusier's conviction about modern art, about the latest health and exercise regimens, and about the importance of new technology for the contemporary society.

The Steins shared their love of art, but they also had in common a fondness for the latest theories on health and fitness, and took up  stringent new diets and exercise regimens with enthusiasm. Leo and Sarah in particular were convinced that the way to be free of the depressions and anxieties that troubled them was through rigorous physical self-discipline. The Steins also took interest in psychology and medicine, and Sarah in particular followed her sister-in-law's progress at Radcliffe. Sarah's letters from San Francisco are full of questions about Gertrude's course.

Later life
Sarah and Michael moved back to the U.S. in 1935 and brought their collection with them. They purchased a home on Kingsley Ave. in Palo Alto, CA.

When Sarah Stein began to slowly disperse her art collection in the years before her death in 1953, Elise Stern Haas, wife of Walter A. Haas, purchased a Matisse portrait of Sarah and convinced a Chicago collector, Nathan Cummings, to acquire a similar portrait of Michael, with the understanding that both would eventually become part of the collection of the San Francisco Museum of Modern Art.

References

Notes

1870 births
1953 deaths
American art collectors
American people of German-Jewish descent
People from San Francisco
Henri Matisse